John Elliott (born 4 November 1934) is an Australian wrestler. He competed at the 1952 Summer Olympics and the 1956 Summer Olympics.

References

1934 births
Living people
Australian male sport wrestlers
Olympic wrestlers of Australia
Wrestlers at the 1952 Summer Olympics
Wrestlers at the 1956 Summer Olympics
Place of birth missing (living people)